Minnesota's 3rd congressional district encompasses the suburbs of Hennepin and Anoka counties to the west, south, and north of Minneapolis. The district, which is mostly suburban in character, includes a few farming communities on its far western edge and also inner-ring suburban areas on its eastern edge. The district includes the blue collar cities of Brooklyn Park and Coon Rapids to the north-east, middle-income Bloomington to the south, and higher-income Eden Prairie, Edina, Maple Grove, Plymouth, Minnetonka, and Wayzata to the west. Democrat Dean Phillips currently represents the district in the U.S. House of Representatives, after defeating incumbent Republican Erik Paulsen in the November 2018 mid-term elections.

Statewide election voting

List of members representing the district

Recent elections

2020

2018

2016

2014

2012

2010

2008

2006

2004

2002

2000

Historical district boundaries

See also

Minnesota's congressional districts
List of United States congressional districts

References

 Minnesota Public Radio

03